Tung Wah Eastern Hospital is a charitable rehabilitation hospital located at Causeway Bay and operated by the Tung Wah Group of Hospitals. The hospital was formerly called Indian General Hospital (IGH).

Opened on 27 November 1929, the hospital is located in So Kon Po, Causeway Bay and became a public hospital in 1991. It is primarily for the rehabilitation of patients who are almost ready to be discharged from the hospital system. Thus, patients are typically not severely ill or injured. This is why there are no emergency or accident facilities.

The rooftop garden, located on what would be the fourth floor, gives both staff and patients the opportunity to enjoy fresh air, sunshine and a scenic view of the local area.

Notes

References

External links

Hospital buildings completed in 1929
Hospitals in Hong Kong
Tung Wah Group of Hospitals
So Kon Po
Hospitals established in 1929
Grade II historic buildings in Hong Kong